The 1996–97 season was Collingwood Warriors' only season in their history and in the National Soccer League. In addition to the domestic league, Collingwood Warriors participated in the final NSL Cup. Collingwood Warriors finished 13th in their National Soccer League season, and won the NSL Cup winning 1–0 in the Final against Marconi Fairfield.

Players

Competitions

Overview

National Soccer League

League table

Matches

NSL Cup

Statistics

Appearances and goals
Players with no appearances not included in the list.

References

Collingwood Warriors SC seasons
1996–97 National Soccer League season by team